Canterbury Cemetery is a small Commonwealth War Graves Commission cemetery located at ANZAC Cove in Turkey. It contains the remains of 27 soldiers from the New Zealand Expeditionary Force. 26 were from the Canterbury Mounted Rifles and one from the Wellington Regiment. It is the only CWGC cemetery on the Gallipoli peninsula which has no epitaphs on any of the grave markers.

References

External links
 

Commonwealth War Graves Commission cemeteries in Gallipoli